Martin Henry Cullimore (4 December 1908 – 21 July 1996) was an English cricketer. Cullimore was a right-handed batsman. He was born at Stroud, Gloucestershire.

Cullimore made his first-class debut for Gloucestershire against Leicestershire in the 1929 County Championship at Aylestone Road, Leicester. He made two further first-class appearances for the county in 1929, against Northamptonshire at the Town Ground, Kettering, and Essex at the Wagon Works Ground, Gloucester. In his three first-class matches, he scored 19 runs at an average of 6.33, with a high score of 15.

He died at the town of his birth on 21 July 1996.

References

External links
Martin Cullimore at ESPNcricinfo
Martin Cullimore at CricketArchive

1908 births
1996 deaths
Cricketers from Stroud
English cricketers
Gloucestershire cricketers